Jez Lofthouse (born 16 October 1999), is an Australian professional footballer who plays as a winger for Brisbane Roar.

References

External links

Living people
1999 births
Australian soccer players
Association football forwards
Brisbane Roar FC players
A-League Men players
National Premier Leagues players